Daniel Stewart MacMaster (July 11, 1968 – March 16, 2008) was a Canadian singer, who was lead vocalist for the Canadian/British hard rock band Bonham.

Career
With Bonham, he released two albums: 1989's The Disregard of Timekeeping (which peaked at Number 38 on the Billboard charts) and 1992's Mad Hatter. In 2001, Daniel was looking to put a new project together, starting with guitarist Stefano Fantin, and a string of small club dates were performed in the Barrie area, though, due to musical differences, they parted ways. In 2005, Daniel released a solo album entitled Rock Bonham...And The Long Road Back which was re-issued by Suncity Records in 2006. Later, MacMaster started a new project with Connecticut-based singer-songwriter Jimmy D of the band Emerald Monkey, dubbed Monkey-MacMaster. The group was planning on releasing music and playing shows; in addition MacMaster had been working on his own material.  However, neither of these projects were completed due to MacMaster's death.

Death
MacMaster died from a Group A streptococcal infection, which he thought was a cold, after developing sepsis, at Thunder Bay Regional Health Sciences Centre, on March 16, 2008. He was married and had two children, Kaleb and Aryanna.

Discography

Studio albums
Rock Bonham... And the Long Road Back (2005)

with Bonham
The Disregard of Timekeeping (1989)
Mad Hatter (1992)

with Scorcher
No Thanks (1994)

Guest appearances
Emerald Monkey – Heroes of the Night – A Tribute to KISS (2008)

References

External links
Sleazeroxx.com
Radio3.cbc.ca
Daniel MacMaster interview with MusicMayhem.Rocks

1968 births
2008 deaths
Canadian male singers
Musicians from Barrie
Deaths from staphylococcal infection
Infectious disease deaths in Ontario
Canadian heavy metal singers
20th-century Canadian male singers
Bonham (band) members